Keith Palmer may refer to:

 Keith Palmer (businessman) (born 1947), British businessman
 Keith Palmer (footballer) (1919–2008), Australian rules footballer
 Keith Palmer (singer) (1957–1996), American country music artist
Keith Palmer (album), his album
 Keith Palmer (film editor) (born 1942), British film editor 
 Maxim (musician) (born 1967), stage name of Keith Palmer, British rap musician
 Keith Palmer (24 character), a character from the television series 24
 SS Keith Palmer, American Liberty ship named for a journalist killed by the Japanese in World War II
 Keith Palmer (police officer) (1969–2017), London police constable killed in the Westminster attack

Palmer, Keith